Paul R. Franklin (January 2, 1906 – August 26, 1959) was a professional American football player who played running back for the Chicago Bears.

References

External links

1906 births
1959 deaths
American football running backs
Chicago Bears players
Franklin Grizzlies football players
Players of American football from Indiana
People from Plainfield, Indiana